Perceptions of Pacha is a studio album by Goldfish, released on August 29, 2008. With the album, the group set a new South African Music Awards record for most nominations in 2009, with eight nominations including Best Duo or Group and Album of the Year, winning Best Engineer and Best Dance Album for Perceptions of Pacha.

Track listing

Awards and nominations

Personnel

Goldfish - primary artist
Dominic Peters - writer, engineer, keyboards, double bass, bass guitar, programming
David Poole - writer, engineer, vocals, saxophone, flute, programming

References

External links
 GoldfishLive.com
Perceptions of Pacha at Allmusic
Perceptions of Pacha at Discogs

2008 albums
Goldfish (band) albums
Electropop albums